Rüdiger Ziehl (born 26 October 1977) is a German football manager and former player who manages 1. FC Saarbrücken.

Playing career
Ziehl was born in Zweibrücken. He made his debut on the professional league level in the Bundesliga for 1. FC Kaiserslautern on 11 March 2001 when he came on as a substitute in the 83rd minute in a game against 1860 Munich.

Managerial career
Ziehl ended his active career in 2012 and was named assistant manager at his last club, VfL Wolfsburg II. After four years as an assistant and two stints as interim manager, he was named head coach in 2016. He left the club in 2020.

On 28 June 2021, Ziehl was named head coach of 3. Liga club TSV Havelse starting in the 2021–22 season. A year later he as the intertim manager of 1. FC Saarbrücken.

References

External links

1977 births
Living people
People from Zweibrücken
German footballers
Footballers from Rhineland-Palatinate
Association football midfielders
Bundesliga players
FK Pirmasens players
1. FC Kaiserslautern players
1. FC Kaiserslautern II players
SV Wehen Wiesbaden players
TuS Koblenz players
VfL Wolfsburg II players
German football managers
3. Liga managers
TSV Havelse managers
1. FC Saarbrücken managers